Tanisha Nicole Brito (born September 11, 1980) is a beauty queen who has competed at both Miss America and Miss USA. Her home town is Waterford, Connecticut. Brito graduated from Waterford High School in 1998. She attended Clark Atlanta University in Georgia which gave her the residency permission to compete in that state's pageant.

Brito's first major pageant was the 2000 Miss Connecticut state pageant, where she finished second runner-up. The following year she competed in Georgia, where she won a non-finalist interview award. She returned to Connecticut in 2002, where she won the swimsuit award and Miss Connecticut crown. Brito was a top ten finalist in the Miss America 2003 pageant.

On November 6, 2004, Brito was crowned Miss Georgia USA.

She competed in the Miss USA 2005 pageant held in Baltimore, Maryland on 11 April 2005, but failed to make the cut at the nationally televised pageant. While preparing for the Miss America pageant, Brito attended the University of Connecticut at Avery Point so as not to disadvantage her studies.

References

Profile of Brito on the Miss Connecticut website (accessed 3 May 2006)
Profile of Brito on the official Miss America website (accessed 3 May 2006)
Profile of Brito on the Miss Georgia USA website (accessed 3 May 2006)

External links
Official Website
Official Miss Connecticut website
Official Miss Georgia USA website

1980 births
Living people
People from Waterford, Connecticut
Miss America 2003 delegates
Miss USA 2005 delegates
Clark Atlanta University alumni